Brooklyn Heights is the name of a neighborhood in New York City.

Brooklyn Heights may also refer to several other places in the United States:
Brooklyn Heights Historic District, overlapping historic district in Brooklyn Heights
Brooklyn Heights, Missouri, village in Jasper County, Missouri
Brooklyn Heights, Ohio, village in Cuyahoga County, Ohio
Brooklyn Heights, Los Angeles

It may also refer to these books:
Brooklyn Heights (book)
Brooklyn Heights: A Personal Memoir

See also
Brooklyn Heights Promenade
Brooklyn Heights Railroad
Brooke Lynn Hytes, Canadian drag queen